Bethlehem Lutheran Church (also known as Swedish Evangelical Lutheran Bethlehem Church) is a historic Lutheran church in Nordland Township, Minnesota, United States. The church was constructed in 1897 by Swedish immigrants. The Gothic Revival building features a square tower topped by a belfry and an octagonal spire. The church's congregation formed in 1891 and was the second of five Swedish Lutheran churches established in the county. Aitkin County received a large influx of Swedish immigrants in the late 1800s, and the church is one of the best-preserved buildings constructed by the immigrant population upon their arrival.

The church was added to the National Register of Historic Places in 1982.

See also
 National Register of Historic Places listings in Aitkin County, Minnesota

References

Buildings and structures in Aitkin County, Minnesota
Churches completed in 1897
Churches on the National Register of Historic Places in Minnesota
Gothic Revival church buildings in Minnesota
Lutheran churches in Minnesota
National Register of Historic Places in Aitkin County, Minnesota
Swedish-American culture in Minnesota
1897 establishments in Minnesota